Walter Morrison Jeffords Sr. (August 8, 1883 – September 28, 1960) was a successful Investment banker and owner/breeder of Thoroughbred racehorses who, in partnership with his wife's uncle, Samuel Riddle, purchased and operated Faraway Farm near Lexington Kentucky where they stood Man o' War.

Jeffords is one of only five people to be named an Exemplar of Racing by the National Museum of Racing and Hall of Fame.

His former estate is now Ridley Creek State Park.

References

1883 births
1960 deaths
Yale University alumni
American racehorse owners and breeders
Businesspeople from Philadelphia
20th-century American businesspeople